The ancient city of Qalhat, or Galhat (in the map of Abraham Ortelius, it named as Calha), is located just over 20 km north of Sur, in the Ash Sharqiyah Region of northeastern Oman.

Site description 
Marco Polo visited Qalhat in the 13th century, referring to it as Calatu. Ibn Battuta visited the city in the 14th century, noting that it had "fine bazaars and one of the most beautiful mosques."  He further noted the mosque was built by Bibi Maryam and included walls of qashani.  Bibi Maryam continued to rule Qalhat and Hurmuz after the death of her husband Ayaz in 1311 or 1312. Zheng He visited the city in the 15th century, referring to it as 加剌哈 (Mandarin: jia-la-ha; Cantonese: gaa-laat-haa).

Qalhat served as an important stop in the wider Indian Ocean trade network, and was also the second city of the Kingdom of Ormus. By 1507 when it was captured by Afonso de Albuquerque on behalf of the Portuguese Empire, the city was already in decline as trade shifted to Muscat. Very little remains of the ancient city, save for the now dome-less mausoleum of Bibi Maryam. Artifacts from as far away as Persia and China were found on-site.

Recently, a research conducted by geoarchaeologists of the University of Bonn conclude that earthquake activity along the most prominent structural element, the Qalhat Fault, is a plausible reason for the decline of the medieval city.

World Heritage Status 

This site was added to the UNESCO World Heritage Tentative List on July 4, 1988 in the Cultural category. The ancient city became a World Heritage site in 2018.

Qalhat LNG Terminal 
The Oman LNG LLC S.A.O.C. owned Qalhat LNG Terminal is situated at the Port of Qalhat.

References 

Archaeological sites in Oman
Populated places in Oman
History of Oman
World Heritage Sites in Oman